Popsicle is an alternative rock album by indie band Diamond Nights, released in 2005. The song "The Girl's Attractive" was featured in a 2006 Jaguar and an Austrian beer (Stiegl) advertisement, as well on the "Thirst" and "Nicodemus" episodes of the TV drama Smallville, and was included on its second Soundtrack The Metropolis Mix .

Track listing 
 "Destination Diamonds"
 "Saturday Fantastic"
 "Drip Drip"
 "It's a Shokka"
 "Red Hex"
 "The Girl's Attractive"
 "Beyond the City of Love"
 "Snakey Ruth"
 "Dirty Thief"
 "Needle in the Rice"
 "A Kiss to Tell"
 "Ordinary Life"

External links 
Diamond Nights official website

2005 debut albums
Diamond Nights albums